Michael Holbrook "Brook" Steppe (born November 7, 1959) is an American former basketball player in the National Basketball Association (NBA). He was a 6'5"  shooting guard. Born in Chapel Hill, North Carolina, Steppe played competitively from 1977 to 1982 at DeKalb Central Community College and Georgia Institute of Technology, where he was twice named First Team All-ACC.   He was selected with the 17th pick in the 1982 NBA draft by the Kansas City Kings.

He played five NBA seasons with as many teams until 1989.

He was once suspended for one game without pay by the Kansas City Kings during his rookie season in 1983 when he missed a plane from Atlanta to Kansas City.

Following his playing career, Steppe got into coaching. He spent four seasons as an assistant men's basketball coach at Kennesaw State.

Notes

External links

 Israel National League Stats 1989-90

1959 births
Living people
American expatriate basketball people in France
American expatriate basketball people in Israel
American men's basketball players
Baltimore Lightning players
Basketball players from North Carolina
Capital Region Pontiacs players
Israeli Basketball Premier League players
Detroit Pistons players
Fort Wayne Fury players
Hapoel Tel Aviv B.C. players
Georgia Tech Yellow Jackets men's basketball players
Hartford Hellcats players
Indiana Pacers players
Junior college men's basketball players in the United States
Kansas City Kings draft picks
Kansas City Kings players
Paris Racing Basket players
Pensacola Tornados (1986–1991) players
People from Chapel Hill, North Carolina
Portland Trail Blazers players
Rochester Renegade players
Sacramento Kings players
Shooting guards
Tampa Bay Thrillers players